Mikhail "Moshe" Arnoldovich Milner (Мильнер, Михаил "Моше" Арнольдович; Rokitno Basilovsky, Kiev Governorate 1886-Leningrad, 1953) was a Russian Jewish pianist and composer. He is notable as composer, and conductor, of the first Yiddish opera in post-revolution Russia "Die Himlen brenen" ("The Heavens Burn") in 1923.

He sang in the choir of the Brodsky Choral Synagogue in Kiev, then attended the Kiev Conservatory. He studied at the St. Petersburg Conservatory from 1907 till 1915. While in St Petersburg Milner began to compose Yiddish songs for Susman Kiselgof (Зусман Кисельгоф)'s Society for Jewish Folk Music (Общество еврейской народной музыки).  He also wrote incidental music for Jewish theaters. He provided music for the Habima Theater and State Jewish Theater, Moscow (GOSET) (Государственный еврейский театр (ГОСЕТ)), and the Leningrad choir Evokans (Евоканс).

References

1886 births
1953 deaths
Jewish composers
Jewish classical composers
Russian classical composers
Russian Jews
Russian male classical composers
20th-century Russian male musicians